In mathematics, the fundamental group scheme is a group scheme canonically attached to a scheme over a Dedekind scheme (e.g. the spectrum of a field or the spectrum of a discrete valuation ring). It is a generalisation of the étale fundamental group.  Although its existence was conjectured by Alexander Grothendieck, the first proof if its existence is due, for schemes defined over fields, to Madhav Nori. A proof of its existence for schemes defined over Dedekind schemes is due to Marco Antei, Michel Emsalem and Carlo Gasbarri.

History
The (topological) fundamental group associated with a topological space is the group of the equivalence classes under homotopy of the loops contained in the space. Although it is still being studied for the classification of algebraic varieties even in algebraic geometry, for many applications the fundamental group has been found to be inadequate for the classification of objects, such as schemes, that are more than just topological spaces. The same topological space may have indeed several distinct scheme structures, yet its topological fundamental group will always be the same. Therefore, it became necessary to create a new object that would take into account the existence of a structural sheaf together with a topological space. This led to the creation of the étale fundamental group, the projective limit of all finite groups acting on étale coverings of the given scheme . It was from this idea that Grothendieck hoped for the creation of a new true fundamental group (un vrai groupe fondamental, in French), the existence of which he conjectured, back in the early 1960s in his celebrated SGA 1, Chapitre X. More than a decade had to pass before a first result on the existence of the fundamental group scheme came to light. As mentioned in the introduction this result was due to Madhav Nori who in 1976 published his first construction of this new object  for schemes defined over fields. As for the name he decided to abandon the true fundamental group name and he called it, as we know it nowadays, the fundamental group scheme. The demonstration of the existence of  defined on regular schemes of dimension 1 had to wait about forty more years. There are various generalizations such as the -fundamental group scheme  and the quasi finite fundamental group scheme .

Definition and construction
The original definition and the first construction have been suggested by Nori for schemes  over fields. Then they have been adapted to a wider range of schemes. So far the only complete theories exist for schemes defined over schemes of dimension 0 (spectra of fields) or dimension 1 (Dedekind schemes) so this is what will be discussed hereafter:

Definition
Let  be a Dedekind scheme (which can be the spectrum of a field) and  a faithfully flat morphism, locally of finite type. Assume  has a section .

Over a field
There are nowadays several existence results for the fundamental group scheme of a scheme  defined over a field . In this situation however there are no tannakian categories involved. Since then several other existence results have been added, including some non reduced schemes.

Over a Dedekind scheme
Let  be a Dedekind scheme of dimension 1,  any connected scheme and  a faithfully flat morphism locally of finite type. Assume the existence of a section . Then the existence of the fundamental group scheme  as a group scheme over  has been proved by Marco Antei, Michel Emsalem and Carlo Gasbarri in the following situations:
 when for every  the fibres  are reduced 
 when for every  the local ring  is integrally closed (e.g. when  is normal).

Over a Dedekind scheme, however, there is no need to only consider finite group schemes: indeed quasi-finite group schemes are also a very natural generalization of finite group schemes over fields. This is why Antei, Emsalem and Gasbarri also defined the quasi-finite fundamental group scheme   as follows:
let  be a Dedekind scheme and  a faithfully flat morphism, locally of finite type. Assume  has a section . They proved the existence of  when for every  the fibres  are integral and normal.

Properties

Connections with the étale fundamental group
When the base scheme  is the spectrum of an algebraically closed field  then it coincides with the étale fundamental group .

The product formula
This result was conjectured by Nori and proved by Vikram Mehta and Subramanian.

See also
Étale fundamental group
Fundamental group

Notes

Scheme theory
Topological methods of algebraic geometry